Alla Peunova (born 3 August 1940) represented the Soviet Union in archery at the 1972 Summer Olympic Games.She was born in Donetsk.

Olympics 
Peunova competed in the women's individual event and finished eighth with a score of 2364 points.

References

External links 
 Profile on worldarchery.org
 

1940 births
Living people
Soviet female archers
Olympic archers of the Soviet Union
Archers at the 1972 Summer Olympics
Herzen University alumni